The Western Siouan languages, also called Siouan proper or simply Siouan, are a large language family native to North America. They are closely related to the Catawban languages, sometimes called Eastern Siouan, and together with them constitute the Siouan (Siouan–Catawban) language family.

Linguistic and historical records indicate a possible southern origin of the Siouan people, with migrations over a thousand years ago from North Carolina and Virginia to Ohio. Some continued down the Ohio River, to the Mississippi and up to the Missouri. Others went down the Mississippi, settling in what is now Alabama, Mississippi and Louisiana. Others traveled across Ohio to what is now Illinois, Wisconsin, and Minnesota, home of the Dakota.

Family division

The Siouan family proper consists of some 18 languages and various dialects:

 Mandan †
 Nuptare
 Nuetare

 Missouri River Siouan (a.k.a. Crow–Hidatsa)
 Crow (a.k.a. Absaroka, Apsaroka, Apsaalooke, Upsaroka) – 3,500 speakers
 Hidatsa (a.k.a. Gros Ventre, Minitari, Minnetaree) – 200 speakers
 Mississippi Valley Siouan (a.k.a. Central Siouan)
Mitchigamea? †
 Dakotan (a.k.a. Sioux–Assiniboine–Stoney)
 Sioux – 25,000 speakers
 Lakota – 2,100 speakers
 Dakota (sometimes classified as Western and Eastern Dakota) – 290 speakers
 Assiniboine – 150 speakers
 Stoney – 3,200 speakers
 Chiwere-Winnebago
 Chiwere †
 Winnebago – 250 speakers
 Dhegihan
 Omaha–Ponca – 85 speakers
 Kansa-Osage
 Kansa  †
 Osage  †, on ongoing revival
 Quapaw – 1 speaker
 Ohio Valley Siouan
 Virginia Siouan
 Tutelo †
 Moneton †
 Mississippi Siouan
 Biloxi †
 Ofo †
(†) – Extinct language

Another view of both the Dakotan and Mississippi Valley branches is to represent them as dialect continuums.

All the Virginia Siouan dialects listed here are thought to have been closely related to one another; the term Tutelo language is also used in reference to their common tongue.

Writing systems
There are two systems used to transcribe within this family:
 Latin alphabet used by a majority of these languages.
 Osage script, developed in 2005 by Herman Mongrain Lookout. There are also considerations for the script to be extensively usable for other languages in the Dhegiha group to the extent of this family.

See also

 Siouan–Catawban languages

Bibliography

 Parks, Douglas R.; & Rankin, Robert L. (2001). "The Siouan languages", in R. J. DeMallie (Ed.), Handbook of North American Indians: Plains (Vol. 13, Part 1, pp. 94–114). W. C. Sturtevant (Gen. Ed.). Washington, D.C.: Smithsonian Institution. .
Rood, David S.; & Taylor, Allan R. (1996). "Sketch of Lakhota, a Siouan language", in Handbook of North American Indians: Languages (Vol. 17, pp. 440–482). Washington DC: Smithsonian Institution.
 Ullrich, Jan. (2008). New Lakota Dictionary: Incorporating the Dakota Dialects of Santee–Sisseton and Yankton–Yanktonai (Lakota Language Consortium). .

References

External links
 The Siouan Languages Bibliography
 Siouan languages FAQ
 Siouan languages mailing list archive
 Comparative Siouan languages Swadesh vocabulary lists (from Wiktionary)

 

Indigenous languages of the North American Plains
Indigenous languages of the North American Southeast
Sioux culture
Indigenous languages of North America